Last Man on Earth is the sixteenth studio album by American singer-songwriter Loudon Wainwright III, released on September 24, 2001 on Red House Records. Recorded in the wake of Wainwright's mother's death and the collapse of a romantic relationship, the album thematically addresses feelings of grief and loneliness. In 2012, Wainwright noted, "Last Man on Earth was written right after my mother died, so a lot of the material on that record has to do with that momentous event. The life circle was present on a lot of those songs."

Portions of the album also reflect upon Wainwright's troubled relationship with his father, Loudon Wainwright, Jr., a subject that has populated many of his earlier recordings. Last Man on Earth can be seen as a companion piece to his 1992 album, History, written after the death of his father.

Background
In 1997, following his mother's funeral, Wainwright stayed in her home in Katonah, Westchester County for eighteen months. During this time, Wainwright wrote much of the album's material.

Last Man on Earth was released four years after Wainwright's mother's death. The working title for the album was Missing You, named after the album's opening track. However, the album's title ultimately became Last Man on Earth, a song written in Suffolk County following Wainwright's eventual move from his mother's old home.

Track listing
"Missing You" – 3:29
"Living Alone" – 2:37
"White Winos" – 2:59
"Fresh Fossils" – 1:50
"I'm Not Gonna Cry" – 2:06
"Out of Reach" – 2:57
"Bridge" – 1:43
"Surviving Twin" – 3:41
"Donations" – 2:02
"Graveyard" – 2:13
"Bed" – 2:53
"Last Man on Earth" – 5:01
"Homeless" – 4:14

Personnel
The following people contributed to Last Man on Earth:

Musicians
Loudon Wainwright III – vocals, guitar, five-string banjo
Stewart Lerman – guitars, bass, organ, Wurlitzer, percussion
Dick Connette – piano, spinet, celeste, harmonium, percussion, arrangements
Steuart Smith – electric guitar, acoustic guitar, piano, organ, Wurlitzer, accordion, bass, harmonica
David Mansfield – fiddle, viola, mandolin, dulcimer, guitar, percussion, string arrangements on "White Winos"
Sammy Merendino – drums, percussion
Mary Rowell – violin, viola
Marshall Coid – violin
Dorothy Lawson – cello
Brian Stanley – bass ("Living Alone")
Johnny Gale – vocals and vocal arrangements ("Bridge")
Little Isidore – vocals ("Bridge")
Suzzy Roche – vocals ("Bed" and "Last Man on Earth")

Recording personnel
Stewart Lerman – producer, recording, mixing
Scott Lehrer – additional engineering ("Bed" and "Missing You")
Dominick Maita – mastering

Artwork
Deborah Feingold – inlay photograph
Patti Perret – beach photos
Don Stettner – back cover painting
Hugh Brown – layout and design

Release history
CD: Red House 158
CD: Evangeline 4025
CD: Evangeline 4076

References

External links
 "Album biography" taken from the Rosebud Agency website.

Loudon Wainwright III albums
2001 albums
Red House Records albums
Albums produced by Stewart Lerman